Guillaume Bautru, comte de Serrant (1588, Angers – 7 March 1665, Paris) was a French satirical poet, court favourite and a protégé and diplomatic agent of cardinal Richelieu.

Biography
He was lord of Louvaines, conseiller d'État under Louis XIII and Louis XIV, herald of ambassadors in the king's court, minister plenipotentiary and ambassador to the archduchess of Flanders, and king's envoy to Spain, England and the Duchy of Savoy. He was also one of the founder members of the Académie française, to which he was elected in 1634.

Bautru purchased the Château de Serrant in 1636 and began enlarging it, work which was completed by his son.

References

External links
Académie française
 

French satirists
17th-century French poets
17th-century French diplomats
17th-century French male writers
1588 births
1665 deaths
French male poets
French male non-fiction writers